Magic Mountain, is mainly a water park, which is located in Moncton, New Brunswick, Canada. It is part of the Magnetic Hill tourist site. The park is the largest man-made tourist attraction in Atlantic Canada.

History
The park was created as an addition to the growing tourist site of Magnetic Hill, which already consisted of the hill itself, and the Magnetic Hill Zoo. Construction on the park commenced on August 12, 1986, and through the efforts of more than 600 construction workers it was completed in less than a year, opening on June 26, 1987. In 1999 the park came under new ownership and since then several improvements have been made to the park. A children's "Splash pad", two new children's slides and two new body slides named "Pipeline" and "Sidewinder" were constructed. Other developments include:

2002 - the Tornado tube slide opened.
2005 - two new slides opened named Twist and Shout.
2006 - the Pro Racer was added.
2008 - an all new free-fall body slide replaced the old Kamikaze. Its name and height remains the same.
2011 - The Torpedo opens - Canada's first skybox drop capsule will give riders an opportunity to experience a weightless sensation.
2011 - The Turbo Tunnel opens - a dark body slide that propels a 720 degree figure 8 ride.

Rides and attractions
 The Tornado - A  enclosed tube slide.
 The Lazy River - A lazy river ride on which the rider sits in a tube and floats 1/4 of a mile (400 m) around a replica of a nineteenth century steamship.
 The Giant Twister Slides - Three body slides for the less daring riders.
 The Kamikaze - A speed slide that goes almost on a straight down drop.
 Pro Racer - A two-lane slide on which two people slide down at the same time on rubber mats.
 The Torpedo - A sky box drop capsule that lets riders experience a weightless sensation.
 The Turbo Tunnel - A dark body slide that propels riders 720 degrees.
 Puddle Jumpers Pond - A small children's wading pool with Gizmo the Frog, Pinky the Whale, and Magic Mushroom.
 Pier 36 Mini Golf - 36 holes of mini golf.

External links
 Magic Mountain Official Website
 Owner's Official Website
 Step by Step Directions from Moncton, NB to Magic Mountain Water Park
 Magic Mountain on Guide-O-Parc.

Water parks in Canada
1987 establishments in New Brunswick
Buildings and structures in Moncton
Tourist attractions in Moncton